Rubén Martín Ruiz Díaz Romero (born 11 November 1969) is a former Paraguayan football goalkeeper, who was nicknamed "Puchi" and "La Bomba" during his career. He represented Paraguay at the 1998 FIFA World Cup. In the 1990s, he became a referent of the Mexican outfit Monterrey.

Club
Born in Asunción, Ruiz Díaz began playing football in the youth side of Club Rubio Ñu, before making his senior debut for the club at age 15. He played professional football in the Primera División Argentina and Primera División de México.

International 
Ruiz Díaz made his international debut for the Paraguay national football team on 9 July 1989 in a 1989 Copa América match against Brazil (2–0 loss). He obtained a total number of 11 international caps, earning his last cap in 1998.

References

External links

1969 births
Living people
Paraguayan footballers
San Lorenzo de Almagro footballers
Talleres de Córdoba footballers
C.F. Monterrey players
Club Atlético Zacatepec players
Club Necaxa footballers
Club Puebla players
Liga MX players
Argentine Primera División players
Estudiantes de La Plata footballers
Expatriate footballers in Argentina
Expatriate footballers in Mexico
Paraguayan expatriate sportspeople in Argentina
Paraguayan expatriate sportspeople in Mexico
Paraguayan expatriate footballers
Paraguay international footballers
1998 FIFA World Cup players
Association football goalkeepers
Footballers at the 1992 Summer Olympics
Olympic footballers of Paraguay
1989 Copa América players
1991 Copa América players
1995 Copa América players
1997 Copa América players
Sportspeople from Asunción